The Gloster Gamecock was a biplane fighter designed and produced by the British aircraft manufacturer Gloster.

The Gamecock was a development of the earlier Grebe Mk III, an early interwar fighter procured by the Royal Air Force (RAF). Work on the type commenced in 1924 as a response to Air Ministry Specification 37/23. The principal difference between the two aircraft was the adoption of the Bristol Jupiter radial engine for the Gamecock. in the place of the somewhat unreliable Armstrong Siddeley Jaguar. Various other structural improvements were also made to the fuselage, the armament was also revised to include internally-mounted machine guns. On 22 February 1925, the prototype Gamecock performed its maiden flight.

Evaluation flights at RAF Martlesham Heath resulted in considerable praise for the aircraft; few changes were made as a result. During September 1925, the Air Ministry placed an initial order for 30 production aircraft to fulfil Specification 18/25. Further orders would quickly follow; the first production Gamecock flew in March 1926 and was delivered two months later. While the type was often praised for its maneuverability and speed, it suffered a high rate of accidents in service, leading to a relatively brief flying career with the RAF. The aircraft served considerably longer with the Finnish Air Force; it was produced under license for the service under the local name Kukko and saw action during the Winter War of 1939–1940 against the Soviet Union.

Development
The origins of the Gamecock can be found in the earlier Gloster Grebe. During the mid-1920s, this fighter had proven itself to be relatively popular amongst the pilots of the Royal Air Force (RAF), which typically praised it for its high maximum speed for the era and its manoeuvrability. However, it was also clearly recognised that the Grebe also had some shortcomings even in its later models. One prominent one was the unsatisfactory performance of the Armstrong Siddeley Jaguar engine, which had developed a reputation with ground crews for its poor reliability as well as being difficult to service. Accordingly, Gloster became keenly interested in the replacement of the Jaguar with another engine, and took an interest in the promising Bristol Jupiter radial engine that could deliver similar performance to the Jaguar while being both lighter and considerably less complex.

During the summer of 1924, the Air Ministry issued Specification 37/23, which was tailed around the development of a Jupiter-powered version of the Grebe. Gloster commenced work on the project immediately thereafter. Gloster's design team, headed by Henry Folland, had also identified numerous improvements, typically relating to the aircraft's structure, that could be made. The fuselage was composed almost completely out of wood, although steel tie-rods were used for internal bracing, as well as a combination of aluminium and asbestos for a fireproof bulkhead at the back of the engine bay. One of the more distinctive changes on the new aircraft was the adoption of internally-mounted machine guns in place of the Grebe's external armament arrangement along the top of the fuselage.

Less than six months from the specification's issuing, Gloster had completed construction of the prototype, J7497, which was fitted with the Jupiter IV engine; by this time, orders for a further two prototypes had been ordered. On 20 February 1925, it was delivered to RAF Martlesham Heath to commence a comprehensive evaluation; its maiden flight was performed two days later. Within weeks of its arrival, the prototype's Grebe-style unbalanced rudder was replaced by a redesigned horn-balanced counterpart. It was determined to possess excellent maneuverability, in part due to its engine being placed so close to the aircraft's centre of gravity, and the trials were considered to be a clear success.

By July 1925, in excess of 50 flight hours had been attained with the first prototype; no major changes were made at this stage of the aircraft's development as no major flaws or concerns were being reported. Having been sufficiently convinced, in September 1925, the Air Ministry placed an initial order for 30 production aircraft to meet Specification 18/25, which were given the name Gamecock; these were to be powered by the improved Jupiter VI engine, as fitted to the third prototype. During March 1926, the first production aircraft performed its maiden flight; delivered of the type commenced two months later.

During July 1926, a follow-on order from the Air Ministry for 40 more Gamecocks was received by Gloster; in November of that same year, another 18 aircraft were also ordered.

Operational history
During May 1926, the Gamecock I entered service with No. 23 Squadron at RAF Henlow; this squadron would also be the last of the RAF six squadrons operating the fighter, flying its examples up until July 1931. Both No. 3 Squadron and No. 17 Squadron operated Gamecocks that had been modified for these squadron's night interception duties. The type acquired a particularly attractive reputation amongst the general public for the aerobatic displays that would often be performed at air shows and other major public events during the latter half of the 1920s.

Pilots typically regarded the Gamecock as being an enjoyable aircraft to fly while also being a good gun platform. However, it was also known for possessing a relatively high accident rate, while was a contributing factor towards its relatively brief service life with the RAF – of the 90 operated by the service, 22 were lost in landing or spin accidents, often involving structural failure. The Gamecock also shared the earlier Grebe's undesirable tendency for flutter. As a means of reducing this unfortunate pattern, Gloster investigated and tested various alterations aimed at improving the aircraft's qualities. To this end, the improved Gamecock II, which was introduced in 1928, had been redesigned with a longer upper wing and a modified tail unit, amongst other refinements.

Gloster promoted the type to overseas operators, and the Finnish Air Force had shown interest in the Gamecock I, resulting in an aerial demonstration being performed over Helsinki on 25 March 1927. The following year, the Gamecock II was won a Finnish government contest, leading to a licensing arrangement being made with Gloster, along with an order for a pattern aircraft. Licensed production of the Gamecock, known locally as the Kukko, commenced at the Finnish National Aircraft Factory in 1929. The Kukko was in frontline service with the Finnish Air Force throughout the 1930s, although the type was progressively relegated to training duties towards the end of the decade.

Finnish Kukkos saw combat during the Winter War of 1939–1940 against the Soviet Union. In perhaps the type's highest profile engagement, a single Kukko captured a Soviet Ilyushin DB-3 bomber. On 29 January 1940, the fighter had strafed a pair of Soviet DB-3s when they landed on Finnish soil (which they mistook for Estonia) to transfer fuel from one plane to the other. The strafed crews hurried into the one plane which had enough fuel remaining and escaped, leaving the DB-3 behind to be captured by the Finns. At least one Kukko remained operational with the Finnish Air Force up until September 1944, at which point the last example was scrapped.

Variants

J7497
Prototype to Air Ministry Specification 37/23 powered by a Jupiter IV engine and first flown in February 1925.
J7756
Prototype with Jupiter IV engine.
J7757 
Prototype with Jupiter VI engine.
Gamecock Mk I
Production single-seat fighter aircraft for the RAF, 90 built.
Gamecock Mk II
Single-seat fighter aircraft with revised wing and tail. One new-built for RAF with another Mk I converted to Mk II standard.  There were three exported to Finland in 1928, with a further 15 built under licence in Finland from 1929–1930 as the Kukko. The type remained in Finnish service until 1944.
Gamecock Mk III
One RAF Gamecock Mk II modified with lengthened fuselage for spin trials.
Gambet
A carrier-based version of the Gamecock produced as a private venture. Manufactured under licence for the Imperial Japanese Navy as the Nakajima A1N; about 150 were operated from 1929 to 1935 and saw combat during the Shanghai incident in 1932.

Operators

 Finnish Air Force
 LeLv 24
 LeLv 29
 LeLv 34

 Royal Air Force
 No. 3 Squadron - August 1928 to June 1929
 No. 17 Squadron - January to September 1928
 No. 19 Squadron - One Gamecock used only.
 No. 23 Squadron - May 1926 to September 1931.
 No. 32 Squadron - September 1926 to April 1928
 No. 43 Squadron - March 1926 to June 1928
 No. 2 Flying Training School
 No. 3 Flying Training School
 Central Flying School
 RAF College, Cranwell
 Home Communications Flight

Surviors

. MkII GA-43/G-CGYF Owned By Retro Track And Air Uk Ltd Under Redtoration 

. Replica GA 97/G-CBTS Also owned
Retro Track And Air Uk Ltd Under Restoration

Specifications (Mk. I)

See also

References

Citations

Bibliography

 Green, William and Swanborough, Gordon. "The Era-Ending Gamecock". Air Enthusiast, Number 21, April–July 1983.Bromley, Kent:Pilot Press. p. 1–8, 58–62. ISSN 0143-5450.
 James, Derek N. Gloster Aircraft since 1917. London: Putnam, 1971. .
 James, Derek N. Gloster Aircraft since 1917. London: Putnam and Company Ltd., 1987. .
 Lumsden, Alec and Thetford, Owen. On Silver Wings: RAF Biplane Fighters Between the Wars. London: Osprey Aerospace, 1993. .
 Taylor, M.J.H. (editor) Jane's Encyclopedia of Aviation. London:Bracken, 1989. .
 Thetford, Owen. Aircraft of the Royal Air Force 1918–57. London:Putnam, First edition 1957.
Gloster Gamecock – British Aircraft Directory.

External links

 Ed Coates collection
 DB3 captured by Finland

1920s British fighter aircraft
Gloster aircraft
Single-engined tractor aircraft
Biplanes
Aircraft first flown in 1925